CrossDOS is a file system handler for accessing FAT formatted media on Amiga computers. It was bundled with AmigaOS 2.1 and later. Its function was to allow working with disks formatted for  PCs and Atari STs (and others). In the 1990s it became a commonly used method of file exchange between Amiga systems and other platforms.

CrossDOS supported both double density (720 KB) and high density (1.44 MB) floppy disks on compatible disk drives. As with AmigaDOS disk handling, it allowed automatic disk-change detection for FAT formatted floppy disks. The file system was also used with hard disks and other media for which CrossDOS provided hard disk configuration software. However, the versions of CrossDOS bundled with AmigaOS did not support long filenames, an extension to FAT that was introduced with Microsoft's Windows 95.

History
CrossDOS was originally developed as a stand-alone commercial product by Consultron, which was available for AmigaOS 1.2 and 1.3. In 1992 Commodore included a version of CrossDOS with AmigaOS 2.1 (and with later versions), so that users could work with PC formatted disks. In fact, the bundled version will also work with version 2.0 of AmigaOS. The bundled CrossDOS replaced an obscure tool in earlier versions of AmigaOS that could access FAT formatted disks on a secondary floppy disk drive only (this tool was not a complete file system but a user program to read files from a FAT formatted disk). Development of CrossDOS continued after being bundled with the OS. CrossDOS 7 was the last version released and included support for long filenames and other features not available in the bundled version.

References

See also 

 Amiga Fast File System
 Amiga Old File System
 File Allocation Table
 List of file systems
 Comparison of file systems

AmigaOS
Amiga software
Disk file systems